Broad Bay Colony is a fairly affluent unincorporated community in northeast Virginia Beach, Virginia. Broad Bay Manor is located in the community.

Communities in Virginia Beach, Virginia